Delvino may refer to the following places:

Bulgaria
 Delvino, Blagoevgrad Province
 Delvino, Kardzhali Province

Albania
 Greek name for Delvinë, municipality in Vlorë County